Vault may refer to:

 Jumping, the act of propelling oneself upwards

Architecture 
 Vault (architecture), an arched form above an enclosed space
 Bank vault, a reinforced room or compartment where valuables are stored
 Burial vault (enclosure), a protective coffin enclosure
 Burial vault (tomb), an underground tomb
 Utility vault, an underground storage area accessed by a maintenance hole
 Film vault, in film preservation, a climate-controlled storage facility for films
 Pub vault, a working men's bar in northern England pubs

Arts, entertainment, and media 
 Vault (Marvel Comics), a prison for super-villains in the Marvel Comics universe
 Vaults (Fallout), underground nuclear blast shelters in the Fallout video game series
 Vault (sculpture), a sculpture by Ron Robertson-Swann
 Vault, former drummer for the band Dark Lunacy
 "Vault", a song by Pendulum
 Vault: Def Leppard Greatest Hits (1980–1995), an album
 Vaults (band), a music group from London
 Vault (film), a 2019 film based on the 1975 Bonded Vault heist

Brands and enterprises 
 Vault (drink), a discontinued soft drink made by the Coca-Cola Company from 2005 to 2011
 Vault.com (formerly Vault Reports), a recruitment company founded by Mark Oldman

Computing and technology
 Vault (revision control system), made by SourceGear
 Vault, a cross-platform password manager and authentication tool maintained by HashiCorp
 Autodesk Vault, a data management tool from Autodesk
 Microsoft HealthVault, a web-based personal health record

Mathematics and science 
 Vault (organelle), a ribonucleoprotein found in biological cells
 Vault, in mathematics, a bisected bicylinder Steinmetz solid
 Cranial vault, a space in the skull within the neurocranium
 Vaginal vault, an expanded part of the vaginal canal

Sports 
 Vault (gymnastics), an artistic gymnastics apparatus
 Vault (parkour), a movement to get past an obstacle quickly and efficiently
 Equestrian vaulting, a sport that combines gymnastics and dance on a moving horse
 Pole vault, an athletics event

Other uses
 Svalbard Global Seed Vault (or Doomsday Vault), a secure seed bank in Norway
 Vault Beach (also Bow Beach), Cornwall, England, UK
 Vault Comics, an American comic book publisher

See also 
 List of architectural vaults
 The Vault (disambiguation)
 Treasury
 Voltigeurs